Hannah Slater (née Wilkinson, 1774 – 1812) was an early American pioneer and inventor. Some sources state that she was the first American woman to receive a patent, however others state that Hazel Irwin, in 1808, or Mary Kies, in 1809, was the first.

Early life
Slater grew up in a Quaker family in Pawtucket, Rhode Island, with two sisters, five brothers and parents Lydia and Oziel. Her father was a successful businessman and business partner of Moses Brown, who was in turn in business with Samuel Slater, an industrialist. Brown recommended the Wilkinson home as a suitable place for Samuel Slater to board when he arrived in the area in early 1790. At the time, Hannah was 15 years old. 

Oziel and Lydia were initially against Hannah marrying someone who was not a Quaker; however they relented and on October 2, 1791, Hannah and Samuel were married. In the same year, Samuel opened his own mill in the area and began to build machinery for manufacturing textiles, modeled after the machines he was familiar with in England. This mill has been preserved as a historical site and is known as the Slater Mill Historic Site.

Adult life

Invention 
In 1793, Samuel Slater showed Hannah some very smooth yarn he had spun from long staple Surinam cotton. He intended to use it to produce cloth; however, Hannah and her sister used a hand spinning wheel to spin it into thread, and the resulting thread proved to be stronger than linen thread. The same year, Hannah applied to the U.S. Patent Office for a patent for an invention - a new method of producing sewing thread from cotton. The patent was issued in the name of "Mrs Samuel Slater".

Community work 
Slater was active in religious and welfare organisations in the Pawtucket community, such as the creation of a village Sunday School, and in 1809 a Female Beneficent Society. Slater was treasurer for the society and her sister Lydia was one of its directors.

Family 
Slater gave birth to 10 children, four of whom died in infancy or childhood. The known children and their years of birth are William (b. 1796), Elizabeth (b. 1798), Mary (b. 1801), Samuel (b. 1802), George (b. 1804), John (b. 1805), Horatio (b. 1808), William (b. 1809) and Thomas (b. 1812). 

Slater died in 1812 about two weeks after the birth of her last child, from complications of childbirth. She was 37 years old. Her husband wrote in his memoirs that after her death "the poor lamented her, whose charities and kindness they had experienced". Slater was buried at Mineral Spring Cemetery.

References

1774 births
1812 deaths
18th-century Quakers
19th-century Quakers
18th-century American inventors
American patent holders
Deaths in childbirth
People from Pawtucket, Rhode Island
Inventors from Rhode Island